Oscar Castro-Neves (May 15, 1940 - September 27, 2013), was a Brazilian guitarist, arranger, and composer who is considered a founding figure in bossa nova.

Biography
He was born in Rio de Janeiro as one of triplets and formed a band with his brothers in his youth. At 16 he had a national hit with Chora Tua Tristeza. In 1962 he was in a bossa nova concert at Carnegie Hall, and later he toured with Stan Getz and Sérgio Mendes. He went on to work with musicians from different genres, including  Billy Eckstine, Yo Yo Ma, Michael Jackson, Barbra Streisand, Stevie Wonder, João Gilberto, Eliane Elias, Lee Ritenour, Airto Moreira, Toots Thielemans, John Klemmer, Carol Welsman, Stephen Bishop, and Diane Schuur. During the 1970s and early 1980s he was member of the Paul Winter Consort. With Mendes, Castro-Neves, was a key guitarist in the A&M release "Fool on the Hill" and continued with the classic "Stillness" which was to see the last Brasil '66 grouping. Castro-Neves re-appeared with Sergio Mendes & Brasil 77 on the Vintage '74 album.

He lived in Los Angeles, California where he worked as an orchestrator for several films including Blame it on Rio and Sister Act 2: Back in the Habit. He died of cancer in Los Angeles on September 27, 2013.

Discography

As leader
 Tristeza with Luis Bonfa, Lalo Schifrin (Verve, 1963)
 Alaide Costa and Oscar Castro Neves (Odeon, 1973)
 Um Encontro with Lee Ritenour (Evento, 1974)
 Oscar! (Living Music, 1987)
 Brazilian Scandals (JVC, 1987)
 Maracujá (JVC, 1989)
 More Than Yesterday (JVC, 1991)
 Tropical Heart (JVC, 1996)
 Simpatico with John Klemmer (JVC, 1997)
 Brazilian Days with Paul Winter (Living Music, 1998)
 Playful Heart (Mack Avenue, 2003)
 All One (Mack Avenue, 2006)

As sideman
With Eliane Elias
 1996 The Three Americas 
 1998 Eliane Elias Sings Jobim 
 2004 Dreamer 
 2006 Around the City
 2008 Bossa Nova Stories
 2011 Light My Fire
 2013 I Thought About You
 2022 Quietude

With Antônio Carlos Jobim
 1974 Elis & Tom
 1979 Miúcha & Tom Jobim
 1980 Terra Brasilis

With John Klemmer
 1977 Arabesque
 1978 Simpatico
 1979 Brazilia

With Sergio Mendes
 1968 Fool on the Hill
 1969 Crystal Illusions
 1969 Ye-Me-Lê
 1970 Stillness
 1971 Pais Tropical
 1972 Primal Roots
 1973 Love Music
 1976 Homecooking
 1977 Pelé
 1977 Sergio Mendes & the New Brasil '77
 1978 Brasil '88

With Airto Moreira
 1986 Aqui Se Puede
 2003 Life After That

With Flora Purim
 1974 Stories to Tell
 1978 Everyday Everynight
 2001 Perpetual Emotion
 2003 Speak No Evil

With Lee Ritenour
 1979 Rio
 1989 Color Rit
 2003 World of Brazil

With Diane Schuur
 2003 Midnight
 2005 Schuur Fire

With Paul Winter
 1978 Common Ground
 1985 Canyon
 1985 Concert for the Earth
 1986 Wintersong
 1987 Earthbeat
 1998 Brazilian Days
 2005 Silver Solstice

With others
 1962 Luiz Bonfá Plays and Sings Bossa Nova, Luiz Bonfá
 1970 A Bad Donato, João Donato
 1976 The Best of Two Worlds, Stan Getz
 1978 Manifestations, Manfredo Fest
 1978 Tudo Bem!, Joe Pass
1979 Dream Master, Bill Hughes
 1980 This Time, Al Jarreau
 1981 Cycles, David Darling
 1981 Ella Abraça Jobim, Ella Fitzgerald
 1982 Moments Like This, Bobby Short
 1983 Don Grusin, Don Grusin
 1987 Brasil, The Manhattan Transfer
 1988 September Ballads, Mark Murphy
 1989 Urban Daydreams, David Benoit
 1992 The Brasil Project, Toots Thielemans
 1993 The Brasil Project Vol. 2, Toots Thielemans
 1994 Double Rainbow: The Music of Antonio Carlos Jobim, Joe Henderson
 1995 Vanessa Rubin Sings, Vanessa Rubin
 1996 The Heart Speaks, Terence Blanchard
 2000 Brazil, Rosemary Clooney
 2003 New York, New Sound, Gerald Wilson
 2003 The Language of Love, Carol Welsman

References

External links
 – official site

Oscar Castro-Neves – obituary

Brazilian music arrangers
1940 births
2013 deaths
Bossa nova guitarists
Brazilian jazz guitarists
Brazilian pop guitarists
New-age guitarists
Brazilian male guitarists
Musicians from Rio de Janeiro (city)
20th-century Brazilian musicians
21st-century Brazilian musicians
20th-century composers
21st-century composers
20th-century guitarists
21st-century guitarists
20th-century male musicians
21st-century male musicians
Male jazz musicians
Paul Winter Consort members
Sergio Mendes and Brasil '66 members
Mack Avenue Records artists